The House at 9 Linden Street in Brookline, Massachusetts, USA, is a locally rare example of transitional Greek Revival and Italianate styling, and one of the few surviving houses from the original development of the Linden Street area in the 1840s.  The -story wood-frame house was built in 1843 for Isaac Rich, a partner in a successful merchant firm and a co-founder of Boston University.  The house's mansard roof is a later addition, probably dating to the 1860s.

The house was listed on the National Register of Historic Places in 1985.

See also
National Register of Historic Places listings in Brookline, Massachusetts

References

Houses in Brookline, Massachusetts
Italianate architecture in Massachusetts
Houses completed in 1844
National Register of Historic Places in Brookline, Massachusetts
Houses on the National Register of Historic Places in Norfolk County, Massachusetts

Greek Revival architecture in Massachusetts